Sulda Managed Reserve is a protected area near villages Bozali and Sulda in Akhalkalaki Municipality in Samtskhe-Javakheti region of Georgia. It protects marsh wetland on  an altitude of 2000 m above sea level.

Sulda Managed Reserve is part of Javakheti Protected Areas which also includes Javakheti National Park, Kartsakhi Managed Reserve, Bugdasheni Managed Reserve, Khanchali Managed Reserve, Madatapa Managed Reserve.

See also
 Javakheti National Park

References 

Managed reserves of Georgia (country)
Protected areas established in 2011
Geography of Samtskhe–Javakheti
Tourist attractions in Samtskhe–Javakheti